Rakhim Azizboyevich Azimov (born August 16, 1964, Shurab, Sughd Region) is a Russian political figure, deputy of the 7th and 8th State Duma convocations. 

In 1986 Azimov graduated from the G. V. Plekhanov Leningrad State Mining Institute and Technical University. Later he continued his education at the Diplomatic Academy of the Ministry of Foreign Affairs of the Russian Federation (2002) and St. Petersburg University of the Russian Interior Ministry (2011). In 2004 he was awarded a Doctor of Technical Sciences degree.

From 1986 to 1991, he worked as a mine foreman in the Komi Republic. From 1994 to 1996, he was a part of the trade delegation of the Komi Republic in Moscow. During the 2000 Russian presidential election Azimov was Putin's confidant. In 2002-2003 he was a member of the Federation Council. 

Since September 2021, he has served as a deputy of the 8th State Duma convocation. He ran with the United Russia to represent the Kirov constituency.

Awards 
 Medal of the Order "For Merit to the Fatherland" (2020)
 Medal "For Distinction in the Protection of Public Order"

References

1964 births
Living people
People from Sughd Region
Russian people of Tajik descent
United Russia politicians
21st-century Russian politicians
Eighth convocation members of the State Duma (Russian Federation)
Members of the Federation Council of Russia (after 2000)
Seventh convocation members of the State Duma (Russian Federation)